The 2022 Balloon World Cup is the second edition of the Balloon World Cup, a sporting event organized by Ibai Llanos and Gerard Piqué, based on a game of keep-up with a balloon that went viral on social media. This is the first edition for which national qualifying tournaments are slated to be held.

The tournament was held on 27 October 2022, at the PortAventura Convention Centre in Vila-seca, Tarragona, the same venue that had hosted the first World Cup the year prior. The number of entering countries was reduced from 32 to 16, with defending champion Francesco de la Cruz being the only returning player. Spain's Miguel Imbroda was crowned world champion defeating Brazil's Claudio Lassance in the final.

Participants
2021 World Cup champion Francesco de la Cruz was announced as a participant during the Spanish qualifier. In September 2022, national qualifiers for multiple Latin American countries were announced as well.

National qualifiers

Spain
The Spanish national qualifier was held on 3 July 2022 at Fira de Barcelona in L'Hospitalet de Llobregat, as part of the third and final day of the 2022 U-Beat Live Fest. Jan Franquesa, who won the bronze medal for Spain at the 2021 World Cup, took part in the tournament, but was eliminated in the first round.

Latin America
National qualifiers for Chile, Argentina, Mexico, Brazil and Colombia were held concurrently in Buenos Aires, Argentina, between 17 and 18 September 2022.

Chile

Argentina

Colombia

Mexico

Brazil

North America
National qualifiers for the United States and Canada took place on 7 October 2022 as part of the first day of the TwitchCon event in San Diego, California, United States.

United States

Canada

Tournament staff

Tournament bracket
The draw to determine the first-round matchups and the tournament bracket was held on 26 October 2022.

References

2022 in Spanish sport
International sports competitions hosted by Spain
Ballooning competitions
2022 in air sports